Dorothy DeLay (March 31, 1917 – March 24, 2002) was an American violin instructor, primarily at the Juilliard School, Sarah Lawrence College, and the University of Cincinnati.

Life 
Dorothy DeLay was born on March 31, 1917, in Medicine Lodge, Kansas to parents who were musicians and teachers. She began studying violin at age 4. At age 14, she graduated from Neodesha High School, where her father was superintendent. DeLay studied for one year at the Oberlin Conservatory with Raymond Cerf, a student of César Thomson, and transferred to broaden her education at Michigan State University, where she earned a B.A. in 1937 at age 20. She then entered the Juilliard Graduate School, where she studied with Louis Persinger, Hans Letz, and Felix Salmond.

She was the founder of the Stuyvesant Trio (1939–42) with her cellist sister Nellis DeLay and pianist Helen Brainard, and she played with Leopold Stokowski's All-American Youth Orchestra.  While touring with this orchestra in 1940, she met Edward Newhouse, a novelist and writer for The New Yorker, and they married four months later in 1941. They had a son, Jeffrey Newhouse and a daughter Alison Newhouse Dinsmore.

In addition to many honorary degrees, Miss DeLay received the National Medal of Arts in 1994, the National Music Council's American Eagle Award in 1995, the Sanford Medal from Yale University in 1997 and the Order of the Sacred Treasure from the Japanese Government in 1998.
In 1975, she was recognized by the American String Teachers Association (ASTA) with their Artist Teacher Award.

Dorothy DeLay died from cancer in New York City at the age of 84. She was survived by her husband, Edward Newhouse, two children, and four grandchildren.

Teaching 
By the mid-1940s, DeLay decided that she did not want to continue as a performer.
In 1946, she returned to Juilliard to study with Ivan Galamian,
becoming his assistant in 1948.
In addition to teaching at Juilliard, she taught at Sarah Lawrence College (1947–1987), the University of Cincinnati – College-Conservatory of Music (30 years until 2001), the New England Conservatory, the Meadowmount School of Music and the Aspen Music Festival and School, among others.

Her former students include many noted violinists of the late 20th century. She assisted Galamian with Itzhak Perlman. She also taught Anne Akiko Meyers, Dr Elizabeth Layton, Albert Stern, Midori Goto, Akiko Suwanai, Sarah Chang, Philippe Quint, Kurt Sassmannshaus, Gong Qian Yang, Cho-Liang Lin, Chin Kim, Christian Altenburger, Jaap van Zweden, Mark Peskanov, Ida Levin, Ray Iwazumi, Shunsuke Sato, Nadja Salerno-Sonnenberg, Angèle Dubeau, Pierre Ménard, Dmitri Berlinsky, Nigel Kennedy, Alyssa Park, Yoon Kwon, Misha Keylin, Shlomo Mintz, Gil Shaham, Dezso and Tibor Vaghy, Fudeko Takahashi, Ayako Yonetani, William Fitzpatrick, Vilhelmas Čepinskis, Brian Lewis, and Li Chuan Yun, Brian Dembow, among others. She also taught many significant orchestral musicians and pedagogues, such as Simon Fischer, author of Basics; Paul Kantor, pedagogue at Rice University; Chicago Symphony Orchestra Concertmaster Robert Chen; Milwaukee Symphony Orchestra concertmaster Frank Almond; Met Orchestra concertmaster David Chan; violinist and pedagogue Anton Miller; Philadelphia Orchestra Concertmaster David Kim; Liu Yang, and Lü Siqing, first Asian violinist to win 1st Prize at the Paganini Competition in Italy, Masao Kawasaki, Hyo Kang, Naoko Tanaka, among others.

In a 1992 interview, Nadja Salerno-Sonnenberg said: "I think the greatest thing about Dorothy DeLay is that she has the ability to look at a young student or an old student and pretty much size up their character and the way that they think — their personality, basically — and how in a short period of time what's the best door to use to get them into here. And that's her method — the fact that there is really no method."

Itzhak Perlman said of DeLay's pedagogic approach: "I would come and play for her, and if something was not quite right, it wasn't like she was going to kill me. She would ask questions about what you thought of particular phrases—where the top of the phrase was, and so on. We would have a very friendly, interesting discussion about 'Why do you think it should sound like this?' and 'What do you think of that?' I was not quite used to this way of approaching things."

DeLay's students have gone forward to solo careers, principal orchestra positions with the world's leading orchestras, and have gone on to win many of the major violin competitions of the world.

In 2003, Itzhak Perlman was appointed to his teacher's position at Juilliard, the Dorothy Richard Starling Chair of Violin Studies. The position was established in 1997 with a leadership grant from the Dorothy Richard Starling Foundation to The Campaign for Juilliard and was held by DeLay until the time of her death in March 2002.

References 

 Sand, Barbara Lourie. Teaching Genius: Dorothy DeLay and the Making of a Musician. New York, Amadeus Press, 2000.  --link to publisher's web page

For an in-depth profile of Miss DeLay, see Helen Epstein's book Music Talks, now on Kindle. This is also available as a separate article on Kindle.

1917 births
2002 deaths
People from Medicine Lodge, Kansas
American classical violinists
20th-century American educators
Aspen Music Festival and School faculty
Cleveland Institute of Music faculty
University of Cincinnati faculty
Juilliard School alumni
Juilliard School faculty
Sarah Lawrence College faculty
Michigan State University alumni
Violin pedagogues
Oberlin Conservatory of Music alumni
United States National Medal of Arts recipients
New England Conservatory faculty
Deaths from cancer in New York (state)
20th-century classical violinists
Women classical violinists
20th-century women musicians
Women music educators
20th-century American women educators
20th-century American violinists